The 1993 National Soccer League First Division was the ninth edition of the NSL First Division in South Africa. It was won by Mamelodi Sundowns.

References

1993